Douglas Andrew Schiess (born February 5, 1970) is a United States Space Force major general who serves as the commander of Combined Force Space Component Command and vice commander of Space Operations Command. He previously served as the deputy commanding general (operations) of the Space Operations Command. He has also commanded the 45th Space Wing, the 21st Space Wing, the 45th Operations Group, and the 4th Space Operations Squadron of the U.S. Air Force. In July 2021, Schiess was nominated for transfer to the United States Space Force and promotion to major general. Schiess transferred from the Air Force to the Space Force on April 28, 2022.

Schiess entered the Air Force as a Distinguished Graduate of ROTC at the University of California at Los Angeles in 1992. He has commanded the 4th Space Operations Squadron at Schriever AFB, Colorado; the 45th Operations Group at Cape Canaveral AFS; and the 21st Space Wing at Peterson AFB, Colorado. The general deployed to Al Udeid Air Base, Qatar, in support of operations Enduring Freedom, Resolute Support and Inherent Resolve. His staff assignments include Headquarters Air Force Space Command, the Air Staff and Office of the Secretary of the Air Force. Prior to his current assignment, General Schiess was the deputy commanding general (operations) of the Space Operations Command.

Education
1988 Yucaipa High School, Yucaipa, California
1992 Bachelor of Science, physics, California State Polytechnic University, Pomona
1996 Master of Science, Human Resources Management, Central Michigan University, Mount Pleasant
1997 Squadron Officer School, Maxwell Air Force Base, Ala.
2000 Master of Arts, Organizational Management, George Washington University, Washington, D.C.
2003 Air Command and Staff College, by correspondence
2004 Master of Science, Space Systems, Air Force Institute of Technology, Wright-Patterson AFB, Ohio
2007 Air War College, by correspondence
2012 Master of Arts, National Security Strategy, National War College, Fort McNair, Washington, D.C.
2014 Director of Space Forces Course, Advanced Space Operations School, Peterson AFB, Colo. 
2015 Enterprise Perspective Seminar, Alan L. Freed Associates, Washington, D.C.
2016 Enterprise Leadership Seminar, Kenan-Flagler Business School, University of North Carolina, Chapel Hill
2018 National and International Security Leadership Seminar, Alan L. Freed Associates, Washington, D.C.
2019 Capstone General and Flag Officer Course, National Defense University, Fort Lesley J. McNair, Washington, D.C.
2021 Advanced Senior Leader Development Seminar, Warrenton, Va.
2022 Cybersecurity: The Intersection of Policy and Technology, Harvard Kennedy School, Cambridge, Mass.
2022 Joint Flag Officer Warfighting Course, Air University, Maxwell AFB, Ala.
2022 Combined/Joint Forces Land Component Commander Course, Army War College, Carlisle Barracks, Pa.

Assignments

1. January 1993 – April 1993, Student, Undergraduate Missile Training, Vandenberg Air Force Base, Calif.
2. April 1993 – September 1995, Intercontinental Ballistic Missile Crew Commander, Deputy Flight Commander, Instructor and ICBM Deputy Crew Commander, 446th Missile Squadron, Grand Forks AFB, N.D.
3. September 1995 – March 1997, Senior Evaluator and ICBM Crew Commander Evaluator, Standardization and Evaluation Division, 321st Missile Group, Grand Forks AFB, N.D.
4. March 1997 – July 1998, Chief of Training, Launch Crew Commander and Launch Controller, 2nd Space Launch Squadron, Vandenberg AFB, Calif.
5. July 1998 – June 2000, Air Force Intern Program with duties in Personnel Force Management Directorate, Air Force Deputy Chief of Staff for Personnel and the Office of the Secretary of Defense (Nuclear, Chemical and Biological Programs), the Pentagon, Arlington, Va.
6. June 2000 – July 2001, Global Positioning System Crew Commander and Satellite Vehicle Operator, 2nd Space Operations Squadron, Schriever AFB, Colo.
7. July 2001 – August 2002, Executive Officer to the Wing Commander, 50th Space Wing, Schriever AFB, Colo.
8. August 2002 – August 2003, Command Lead, Space Professional Development, Vice Commander's Action Group, Headquarters, Air Force Space Command, Peterson AFB, Colo.
9. August 2003 – June 2004, Intermediate Development Education Student, Air Force Institute of Technology,
Wright-Patterson AFB, Ohio
10. June 2004 – July 2005, Chief, Military Satellite Communications Operations Branch, Space Operations Division, Directorate of Strategic Security, Deputy Chief of Staff for Air and Space Operations, the Pentagon, Arlington, Va.
11. July 2005 – July 2007, Chief, Space and Missile Programs, Weapon Systems Division, Legislative Liaison, Office of
the Secretary of the Air Force, the Pentagon, Arlington, Va.
12. July 2007 – June 2009, Operations Officer, 2nd Space Operations Squadron, Schriever AFB, Colo.
13. June 2009 – June 2011, Commander, 4th Space Operations Squadron, Schriever AFB, Colo.
14. July 2011 – July 2012, Student, National War College, Fort McNair, Washington, D.C.
15. July 2012 – April 2014, Commander, 45th Operations Group, Cape Canaveral Air Force Station, Fla.
16. April 2014 – April 2015, Director of Space Forces, U.S. Air Forces Central Command, United States Central Command, Al Udeid Air Base, Qatar
17. June 2015 – July 2017, Commander, 21st Space Wing, Peterson AFB, Colo.
18. July 2017 – August 2018, Senior Military Assistant to the Under Secretary of the Air Force, Office of the Under Secretary of the Air Force, the Pentagon, Arlington, Va.
19. August 2018 – December 2020, Commander, 45th Space Wing; and Director, Eastern Range, Patrick AFB, Fla.
20.  December 2020 – August 2022, Deputy Commanding General Operations after Director, Space and Cyber Operations, Headquarters Space Operations Command, Peterson SFB, Colo.
21.  August 2022-present, Commander, Combined Force Space Component, U.S. Space Command; and Vice Commander, Space Operations Command, U.S. Space Force, Vandenberg SFB, Calif.

Awards and decorations

Schiess is the recipient of the following awards:

 2007 John J. Welch Air Force Award for Excellence in Acquisition Leadership
 2009 Academic Achievement Award, Milstar Initial Qualification Training
 2017 Air Force Space Command General and Mrs. Jerome F. O'Malley Award

Dates of promotion

References

 

 

 

 

Living people
Place of birth missing (living people)
California State Polytechnic University, Pomona alumni
Central Michigan University alumni
George Washington University alumni
Air Force Institute of Technology alumni
United States Air Force colonels
National War College alumni
Recipients of the Legion of Merit
United States Air Force generals
Brigadier generals
Space Operations Command personnel
1970 births